T. J. Vinod is an Indian politician in the Indian National Congress. He is the current member of Kerala Legislative Assembly from Ernakulam.

2019 Kerala legislative assembly by-election 
The United Democratic Front fielded T. J. Vinod in Ernakulam constituency for the 2019 Kerala legislative assembly by-election necessitated after sitting MLA Hibi Eden was elected to the Lok Sabha in the 2019 Indian general election.

References

Indian National Congress politicians
Living people
Kerala MLAs 2016–2021
1962 births
Indian National Congress politicians from Kerala